El Callao is a town of Venezuela. It is the capital of El Callao Municipality of the Bolívar State. The gold mine at El Callao started in 1871, was for a time one of the richest in the world, and the goldfields as a whole saw over a million ounces exported between 1860 and 1883. The gold mining was dominated by immigrants from the British Isles and the British West Indies, giving an appearance of almost creating an English colony on Venezuelan territory.

The real number of inhabitants may be five times higher than the official one, which is around 25.000. This is due to gold mines in the area.

El Callao stands out for being a multicultural Venezuelan city, where diverse mixes and variants of Afro-Caribbean and Antillean culture coexist. Until the middle of the 20th century, when it began to be regulated by the national government, the majority of the inhabitants of El Callao spoke English and Creole languages such as patois, which has mainly French influence, language that has been lost in generations, unlike the rest of the Spanish-speaking population in the country.

History 
The city was founded in the mid-19th century by Venezuelans, Africans, Antilleans, English, Spanish, Brazilians and French who explored the area, hence the various languages (patois) and cuisines descended from these ethnic groups.

One of the most outstanding facts was that in 1876, this population prepared and witnessed the first soccer game in Venezuela.
El Callao and some neighboring towns such as Guasipati, Tumeremo, El Dorado, Kavanayen and Santa Elena de Uairen are the areas with more foreign languages in Venezuela, due to the great migration of foreigners who settled in search of gold. The strongest established languages were the English, the French and the Portuguese, with the lowest influence being Dutch.

Carnivals of El Callao 

The colorful carnivals of El Callao have already gained fame and tradition with the peculiar Guianan calypso that originated with the arrival of the Antilleans from the island of Trinidad who brought their music , gastronomy and its typical English, mixed with the local, giving rise to the local patois and other customs. Notable figure of the carnival troupes and its main sponsor was "Madame" Isidora Agnes, popularly called Negra Isidora, who gave great importance to this show.
The main instruments are the bumbac, the rallo, the bell and the Venezuelan cuatro.
The calypso was a musical genre in which they represented the work of the day to day. It was created as a protest song for the government to let them work.

The carnival is one of the most important in Venezuela, and they say that it is the most awaited party by tourists and inhabitants of the area. It is famous for its colorful and strong cultural richness, and for its catchy calypso music. It has its main characters such as madams, mediopintos, fantasies and devils. There are also other characters created such as the miner, the mamarracho and the black girls.
The founder of the carnivals of El Callao was Isidora Agnes (La Negra Isidora). First they took to the streets in protest of hard work, then parties were organized for the holiday.

References

Populated places in Bolívar (state)